Nichols Farm District, also known as the Susie Nichols Cabin site, is a historic farm and  national historic district located near Cedar Grove, Dent County, Missouri. The district encompasses a house (c. 1910), barn, corn crib, associated landscape features, and refuse dump.  It is representative of a late-19th and early-20th century Ozark farmstead.

It was added to the National Register of Historic Places in 1989.

References

Historic districts on the National Register of Historic Places in Missouri
Farms on the National Register of Historic Places in Missouri
Houses completed in 1910
Buildings and structures in Dent County, Missouri
National Register of Historic Places in Dent County, Missouri